The following article presents a summary of the 2000 football (soccer) season in Brazil, which was the 99th season of competitive football in the country.

Copa João Havelange

The Copa João Havelange was a competition organized by the Clube dos 13, but later recognized by the Brazilian Football Confederation, that replaced the Campeonato Brasileiro Série A, the Campeonato Brasileiro Série B and the Campeonato Brasileiro Série C.

Quarterfinals

|}

Semifinals

|}

Final

Vasco declared as the Copa João Havelange champions by aggregate score of 4–2.

Copa do Brasil

The Copa do Brasil final was played between Cruzeiro and São Paulo.

Cruzeiro declared as the cup champions by aggregate score of 2–1.

Copa dos Campeões
The Copa dos Campeões final was played in a single match between Sport and Palmeiras.

Palmeiras declared as the cup champions after beating Sport 2–1.

Regional and state championship champions

Regional championship champions

State championship champions

Youth competition champions

Other competition champions

Brazilian clubs in international competitions

Brazil national team
The following table lists all the games played by the Brazil national football team in official competitions and friendly matches during 2000.

Women's football

Brazil women's national football team
The following table lists all the games played by the Brazil women's national football team in official competitions and friendly matches during 2000.

The Brazil women's national football team competed in the following competitions in 2000:

Domestic competition champions

References

 Brazilian competitions at RSSSF
 2000 Brazil national team matches at RSSSF
 2000-2003 Brazil women's national team matches at RSSSF

 
Seasons in Brazilian football
Brazil